Back Bay Rugby Football Club (Back Bay RFC) competes in the Southern California Rugby Football Union 3rd Division. The club was founded in 1985 with the consolidation of two first division clubs, Irvine Coast and Newport Beach.

Pitch

The Back Bay RFC practice pitch is located at St. John the Baptist School in Costa Mesa. Home league matches are played at Peninsula Park, located on A Street in Newport Beach.

Club Honors

 2015 Southern California Rugby Football Union (SCRFU) Division 2 Champions
 2009 Southern California Rugby Football Union (SCRFU) Division 2 Champions

Capped players 

The following former Back Bay players have been capped by the USA Rugby Union National Team, known as the "Eagles."

 Ed Burlingham
 Brian Surgener
 David Fee

External links 
Official Site
USA Rugby

References 

Rugby union teams in California
Rugby clubs established in 1985
1985 establishments in California